Pearlington is a census-designated place (CDP) in Hancock County, Mississippi, United States, on U.S. Route 90, along the Pearl River, at the Louisiana state line. It is part of the Gulfport–Biloxi, Mississippi Metropolitan Statistical Area. The population was 1,684 at the 2000 census. On August 29, 2005, Hurricane Katrina made landfall just south of Pearlington.

Geography
Pearlington is located at  (30.249994, -89.604939).

Demographics

2020 census

As of the 2020 United States census, there were 1,153 people, 371 households, and 215 families residing in the CDP.

2000 census
As of the census of 2000, there were 1,684 people, 648 households, and 460 families residing in the CDP. The population density was 184.9 people per square mile (71.4/km). There were 830 housing units at an average density of 91.1 per square mile (35.2/km). The racial makeup of the CDP was 77.55% White, 20.43% African American, 0.36% Native American, 0.12% Asian, 0.12% from other races, and 1.43% from two or more races. Hispanic or Latino of any race were 1.37% of the population.

There were 648 households, out of which 31.5% had children under the age of 18 living with them, 52.3% were married couples living together, 11.9% had a female householder with no husband present, and 29.0% were non-families. 23.3% of all households were made up of individuals, and 9.4% had someone living alone who was 65 years of age or older. The average household size was 2.60 and the average family size was 3.08.

In the CDP, the population was spread out, with 25.8% under the age of 18, 7.3% from 18 to 24, 24.8% from 25 to 44, 29.1% from 45 to 64, and 12.9% who were 65 years of age or older. The median age was 40 years. For every 100 females, there were 99.3 males. For every 100 females age 18 and over, there were 103.4 males.

The median income for a household in the CDP was $31,224, and the median income for a family was $36,711. Males had a median income of $32,450 versus $25,948 for females. The per capita income for the CDP was $14,040. About 18.2% of families and 17.6% of the population were below the poverty line, including 13.0% of those under age 18 and 22.3% of those age 65 or over.

Education
Pearlington is served by the Hancock County School District.

All of Hancock County is in the service area of Pearl River Community College.

John C. Stennis Space Center

In 1961, Pearlington was one of six communities in Hancock County acquired either wholly (Gainesville, Logtown, Napoleon, Santa Rosa, and Westonia) or in part (a section of northern Pearlington), along with a combined population of 700 families who were completely relocated to provide a  acoustical buffer zone for what was envisioned to be NASA's main rocket testing facility, the John C. Stennis Space Center (SSC). , SSC is NASA's largest rocket engine test facility, and also provides testing facilities for more than 30 different state, national, international, public, and private rocket developers and manufacturers.

Remnants of the portion of Pearlington and the other five communities still exist inside the testing buffer zone at SSC, These include such features as now-overgrown city streets and a one-room school house.

Hurricane Katrina 
On August 29, 2005 at 10am CDT (1500 UTC), Hurricane Katrina made a third landfall on Pearlington. The eye of the hurricane made direct contact with Pearlington, halfway between Biloxi, and New Orleans.  Hurricane Katrina came ashore during the high tide of 8:01am, raising flood waters +2.2 feet more.

Hurricane Katrina damaged over 40 Mississippi libraries, gutting the Pearlington Public Library as a total loss, requiring a complete rebuild.

The town had nothing but a place to get water, ice and military-issued meals. There was no Red Cross or shelter. The homes were heaps of debris, and trees and nail-studded boards littered the roads. The people - perhaps 600 of the 1,700 residents - were living in tents and under tarps.  The elementary school buildings that were still standing were opened as shelters after the water went down.

Residents say that Pearlington is old and generally overlooked. It is a fairly segregated and isolated town. It has no mayor. The only form of government is the town's all volunteer fire department, West Hancock Fire Rescue, and its head, Chief Kim Jones.

After further damage from Hurricane Gustav,  Pearlington began to rebuild.

Notable person
 Ripley A. Arnold, founder of Camp Worth, which was eventually renamed Fort Worth, Texas

Notes

External links

 Article on how Pearlington, Mississippi was affected by Hurricane Katrina
 http://westhancockfirerescue.org
 http://thislife.org/Radio_Episode.aspx?sched=1101 This American Life radio program, episode 299: Back From the Dead, 10.07.2005.  Act Two. 'P' Is For Porta-Potty. Producer visits Pearlington to report on activities after Katrina, where it is unclear who is in charge

Census-designated places in Hancock County, Mississippi
Census-designated places in Mississippi
Gulfport–Biloxi metropolitan area